The Constitution of the Republic of Tuva is the basic law of the Republic of Tuva. It was adopted on 6 May 2001.

Background 
The current Constitution of Tuva is the 9th in its history. The first one was made in 1921, for the Tannu-Tuva People's Republic. The current one was adopted in a referendum on May 6, 2001.

References 

 

Politics of Tuva
2001 documents
Law of Russia
Constitutions and charters of federal subjects of Russia